Tusk of Jaguar is the first solo studio album by Japanese guitarist Akira Takasaki, best known for his work in the rock bands Loudness and Lazy. It was released in 1982 only in Japan and reissued in 2005. The album is actually a joint effort of Takasaki and keyboard player Masanori Sasaji, who composed three tracks and arranged and co-produced the recording. A large contribution was given to the album by Takasaki's bandmates in Loudness, who play in most tracks and collaborated to the musical arrangements. However, the music of Tusk of Jaguar is much more varied than in any Loudness' album, with its music ranging from hard rock to progressive rock to jazz fusion, reminiscing of some Dixie Dregs' and Al Di Meola's works. The precise and fast guitar playing by Takasaki is anyway always present in every track and he even takes the lead vocal spot in the song "Ebony Eyes".

Track listing
Side one
"Tusk of Jaguar" (Akira Takasaki) - 3:54  
"Steal Away" (Masanori Sasaji, Milky Way) - 6:13  
"Macula (Far from Mother Land)" (Takasaki) - 4:46  
"Ebony Eyes" (Takasaki, Milky Way) - 5:31

Side two
"Wild Boogie Run" (Sasaji) - 3:17  
"Gunshots" (Takasaki) - 3:07  
"Mid-Day Hunter" (Sasaji) - 4:28  
"Show Me Something Good" (Takasaki, Milky Way) - 4:59  
"Say What?" (Takasaki, Milky Way) - 3:44

Personnel

Musicians
Akira Takasaki - electric and acoustic guitars, lead vocals on track 4, backing vocals, producer
Masanori Sasaji - keyboards and synthesizers, producer
Minoru Niihara - lead vocals on tracks 2 and 8, backing vocals
Masayoshi Yamashita - bass on tracks 1, 3, 4, 6, 7, 8, backing vocals
Munetaka Higuchi - drums on tracks 1, 3, 6, 7, 8, 9
Takayuki Hijikata - bass on track 2
Reuben Tsujino - drums on track 2
Kazuhisa Takahashi - drums on track 4
Poker Face - strings on track 5
Toshihiro Nakanishi - electric violin on track 5
Milky Way - backing vocals

Production
Daiko Nagato - producer
Seigen Ono - engineer, mixing

References

1982 debut albums
Akira Takasaki albums
Columbia Records albums
Albums produced by Daiko Nagato